Vladimir Gadzhev (born 18 July 1987) is a retired Bulgarian professional footballer who played as a midfielder. He was known for his goals from long distance.

A product of the Levski Sofia Academy, Gadzhev joined Greek side Panathinaikos in 2004. He had three loan spells away from Panathinaikos. He was loaned to Levadiakos in 2006, OFI Crete in 2007 and Levski in 2008, and signed for Levski on a permanent basis in 2009.

Career

Youth career
Gadzhev is a product of Levski Sofia's youth academy.

Panathinaikos
In the summer of 2004, at the age of 17, Gadzhev joined Greek side Panathinaikos but failed to break into the first team and was eventually loaned to Beta Ethniki side Levadiakos for the 2006–07 season. He earned 26 appearances for Levadiakos, scored five goals and helping his team gain promotion to the Superleague Greece. For the following campaign Gadzhev was loaned out to Superleague Greece club OFI Crete, where he made 18 appearances.

Levski Sofia
On 4 July 2008, Levski signed Gadzhev on a season-long loan deal. He made his Bulgarian A Group debut in a 1–0 away loss against Vihren Sandanski on 9 August. He scored his first goal for Levski on 27 August, netting the equalizer in the 1–1 away draw against BATE Borisov in the third qualifying round of the 2008–09 UEFA Champions League. Gadzhev play regularly in his first season, making 23 league appearances and collected his first A Group title winner's medal at the end of the 2008–09 season. On 31 May 2009, in the penultimate game of the campaign against Minyor Pernik, Gadzhev scored his first league goal for Levski, clinching the draw 1–1 and the title for the club.

On 7 July 2009, Gadzhev signed a permanent contract with Levski for an undisclosed fee. A week later, he scored his first goal of the 2009–10 season, netting the fourth in a 4–0 win over Sant Julià in the 2nd Qualifying round of Champions League at Georgi Asparuhov Stadium. On 1 August, Gadzhev came on as a substitute in the 2009 Bulgarian Supercup against Litex Lovech. Unfortunately at the end of the game he received a very heavy injury. The diagnose was damaged torn knee ligaments. Cause of that he missed the first part of the season. However, in January 2010 it was announced that Gadzhev recovered from his injury. He made his comeback for Levski from a serious knee injury on 16 March 2010, playing for 60 minutes as a captain of the reserves' 2–2 draw against Litex Lovech. On 20 March, Gadzhev featured as substitute in Levski's 3–0 win over Slavia Sofia in the A Group. On 2 May 2010, he scored the equalizer in a 1–1 away draw with Cherno More.

On 28 July 2011, Gadzhev scored the equalizing goal against Spartak Trnava in UEFA Europa League and afterwards Levski won the game with a 2–1 final score. On 21 November 2011, he signed a two-year contract extension, keeping him at Levski until 2014.

On 17 March 2013, Gadzhev made his 100th league appearance for Levski in a 0–0 draw against Montana.

On 25 September 2013, Gadzhev scored his first brace for the club in a 6–0 win over Neftochimic Burgas.

On 23 May 2014, Gadzhev announced that he would leave Levski. On 1 July, however, he re-signed a new one-year contract with Levski. A few days later, Gadzhev was stripped of the captaincy by new manager Pepe Murcia. After the departure of Valeri Bojinov in August, he was again given the captaincy.

On 7 January 2016 he signed a pre-contract with the Russian team FC Kuban Krasnodar, but 2 weeks later his contract was annulled due to the uncertain financial situation at the club.

Coventry City
On 24 March 2016, after a successful trial period, Gadzhev signed a contract with English club Coventry City until June 2017. He scored his first goal for Coventry in a 3-2 EFL Cup win against Portsmouth on 9 August 2016. He was an unused substitute as Coventry won the 2017 EFL Trophy Final.

Trivia
Gadzhev holds the record for the most red cards in The Eternal Derby of Bulgaria, having been sent off three times, though on two of these occasions it did not affect the proceedings on the pitch, as he was ejected from the bench as well as after the final whistle.

International career
Gadzhev made his international debut on 17 November 2010 in a friendly match against Serbia. Vladimir came in as a substitution in the 65th minute. However, Bulgaria lost the match with a score of 0–1. He scored his first goal in a 2–1 home win over Belarus national football team, a precise long-distance header.

Career stats

Club

National team

International goals
Scores and goals list Bulgaria's goal tally first.

Honours
 A Group: 2008–09
 Bulgarian Supercup: 2009
 EFL Trophy: 2017

References

External links
 Gadzhev at Levski's site
 Guardian's Stats Centre
 Profile at LevskiSofia.info
 

1987 births
Living people
Bulgarian footballers
Bulgaria international footballers
OFI Crete F.C. players
Levadiakos F.C. players
PFC Levski Sofia players
Coventry City F.C. players
Anorthosis Famagusta F.C. players
PFC Beroe Stara Zagora players
FC Hebar Pazardzhik players
Super League Greece players
First Professional Football League (Bulgaria) players
Bulgarian expatriate footballers
Bulgarian expatriate sportspeople in Greece
Expatriate footballers in Greece
Expatriate footballers in England
Expatriate footballers in Cyprus
Association football midfielders
Sportspeople from Pazardzhik